The International Journal of Information Acquisition was founded in 1994 and is published by World Scientific, covering the science and technology of information acquisition. Papers are categorized into Theory, Sensitive Materials and Devices, Sensors, Machine Sensing and Algorithms, Applications, and Reviews. The current Editor-in-Chief is Tao Mei (Hefei Institute of Intelligent Machines,
Chinese Academy of Sciences).

Abstracting and indexing 
The journal is abstracted and indexed inn Inspec.

External links 
 

World Scientific academic journals
Publications established in 1994
English-language journals
Computer science journals